Dhavalikar is an Indian surname. Notable people with the surname include:

Deepak Dhavalikar (born 1958), Indian politician
Madhukar Keshav Dhavalikar (1930–2018), Indian historian and archaeologist
Sudin Dhavalikar (born 1956), Indian politician

Indian surnames